The Loehle 5151 Mustang is a 3/4 scale replica of the P-51 Mustang, designed by American designer Carl Loehle. Its plans are provided for amateur builders. The aircraft has a wooden fuselage with fabric covering.

Development
The wings are wood construction with geodetic supporting structure. The handling is docile and similar to the Piper Cub.

Variants
5151 Mustang
Fixed gear model, with 27 examples flying by the end of 2011. This version is compliant with US light-sport aircraft rules.
5151 RG Mustang
Retractable gear model, with 83 examples flying by the end of 2011.

Specifications (Loehle 5151 Mustang)

See also
Bonsall DB-1 Mustang
Stewart S-51D Mustang
Titan T-51 Mustang
W.A.R. P-51 Mustang
Linn Mini Mustang
Jurca Mustang
FK-Lightplanes SW51 Mustang
Papa 51 Thunder Mustang

References

External links

Photo of 5151 Mustang
Italian 5151 Mustang website
5151 Mustang in articles in EAA and related publications

1980s United States sport aircraft
Homebuilt aircraft
Loehle aircraft
Single-engined tractor aircraft
Low-wing aircraft
North American P-51 Mustang replicas